Jonathan Watling (born February 29, 1976 in Philadelphia, Pennsylvania) is an American rower. Following his rowing career, Watling worked as a medical doctor.

References 

 

1976 births
Living people
American male rowers
Rowers from Philadelphia
World Rowing Championships medalists for the United States